An Easy Life is a 1964 satirical Soviet comedy film directed by Veniamin Dorman. It was seen by 24.6 million Soviet moviegoers during its initial release.

Plot
A chemist by training, Alexandr Petrovich Bochkin (Yury Yakovlev) manages a Moscow dry-cleaning operation, but lives a very comfortable life, taking orders on the side for his speculative "private enterprise," run in conjunction with "Queen Margot" (Faina Ranevskaya). But when his old friend from the chemical institute, Yuri Lebedev (Vsevolod Safonov) arrives in Moscow from the Siberian city of Dalnegorsk, along with a traveling companion, Olga (Ninel Myshkova), Bochkin becomes uncomfortable with his job title. He decides to tell his friends that he is a scientist working on top-secret experiments for the government, but eventually this cover story backfires, leading to one misunderstanding after the other.

Cast
Yury Yakovlev as  Alexander Petrovich Bochkin, underground entrepreneur
Faina Ranevskaya as  "Queen Margot", Margarita Ivanovna, profiteer
Vera Maretskaya as  Vasilisa Sergeevna
Rostislav Plyatt as  Vladimir Gavrilovich Muromtsev, Vasilisa's husband
Ninel Myshkova as  Olga, Vasilisa's sister
Nadezhda Rumyantseva as  Galya, Bochkin's sister
Vsevolod Safonov as  Yuri Lebedev, Bochkin's friend, chief engineer at the plant in Dalnogorsk
Lyusyena Ovchinnikova as Masha
Natalia Golubentseva

References

External links

1964 films
1964 comedy films
Soviet comedy films
Russian comedy films
Gorky Film Studio films
1960s Russian-language films